The Penultimate Galactic Bordello Also the World You Made is an album by Acid Mothers Temple & The Melting Paraiso U.F.O., released in 2004 by Dirtier Promotions. The album spans four CDs in individual sleeves, all contained in one CD Box. Each disc contains only one song, with each song lasting approximately one hour.

Track listing

Personnel

Disc 1

 Cotton Casino - space voice, beer & cigarette
 Tsuyama Atsushi - monster bass, cosmic joker
 Higashi Hiroshi - synthesizer, dancin'king
 Koizumi Hajime - drums, sleeping monk
 Kawabata Makoto - guitar, guitar-synthesizer, hammond organ, voice, RDS-900, speed guru

Disc 2

 Cotton Casino - voice, beer & cigarette
 Tsuyama Atsushi - monster bass, cosmic joker
 Higashi Hiroshi - synthesizer, dancin'king
 Koizumi Hajime - drums, sleeping monk
 Kawabata Makoto - guitar, ney, speed guru

Disc 3

 Cotton Casino - voice, beer & cigarette
 Tsuyama Atsushi - voice, monster bass, piano, drums, toy gameran, cosmic joker
 Higashi Hiroshi - synthesizer, dancin'king
 Koizumi Hajime - drums, sleeping monk
 Kawabata Makoto - guitar, piano, synthesizer, alien voice, speed guru

Disc 4

 Tsuyama Atsushi - super voice, cosmic joker
 Higashi Hiroshi - synthesizer, dancin'king
 Koizumi Hajime - percussion, sleeping monk
 Kawabata Makoto - sarangi, guitar, piano, speed guru

References

Acid Mothers Temple albums
2004 albums